Admiral Sir Ralph Leatham KCB (3 March 1888 – 10 March 1954) was a Royal Navy officer who served as Commander-in-Chief, Plymouth during World War II.

Naval career
Leatham joined the Royal Navy in 1900 as a cadet on the training ship Britannia. He was appointed Commander of the 1st Battle Squadron on 14 June 1938 holding that post until February 1939.

He served in World War II as Commander-in-Chief, East Indies Station from 12 April 1939 until 16 July 1941. He was next appointed as Admiral Superintendent Malta Dockyard and Flag Officer in Charge, Malta from January 1942 taking part in actions against the Italian Navy until December 1942. He became Deputy Governor of Malta in 1943 and was briefly temporary Commander-in-Chief, Levant before becoming Commander-in-Chief, Plymouth later in 1943. He retired in 1946.

In retirement he became Governor of Bermuda.

Family
In 1910 he married Enid Birks; they had one son and one daughter.

References

External links

|-

|-

|-

1888 births
1954 deaths
Royal Navy admirals
Knights Commander of the Order of the Bath
Royal Navy admirals of World War II
Military personnel from Yorkshire
Royal Navy personnel of World War I